Elections were held in Illinois on November 7, 2000.

Primaries were held March 21, 2000.

Election information

Turnout

Primary election

For the primary election, turnout was 25.91%, with 1,748,279 votes cast. 

Turnout by county

General election
For the general election, turnout was 69.18%, with 4,932,192 votes cast.

Turnout by county

Federal elections

United States President

Illinois voted for the Democratic ticket of Al Gore and Joe Lieberman.

United States House

All 20 of Illinois' seats in the United States House of Representatives  were up for election in 2000.

No seats switched parties, with the composition of Illinois' House delegation remaining 10 Democrats and 10 Republicans.

State elections

State Senate
Some of the seats of the Illinois Senate were up for election in 2000. Republicans retained control of the chamber.

State House of Representatives
All of the seats in the Illinois House of Representatives were up for election in 2000. Democrats retained control of the chamber.

Judicial elections
Judicial elections were held.

Local elections
Local elections were held. These included county elections, such as the Cook County elections.

Notes

References

 
Illinois